Great Mill, or its Dutch equivalent, Grote Molen, may refer to:

Great Mill

Great Mill, Appledore, a windmill in Kent
Great Mill, Attleborough, a windmill in Norfolk
Great Mill, Deal, a windmill in Kent
Great Mill, Frindsbury, a windmill in Kent
Great Mill, Haddenham, a windmill in Cambridgeshire
Great Mill, Middleton, a windmill in Norfolk
Great Mill, Sheerness, a windmill in Kent
Great Mill, Southwold, a windmill in Suffolk
Great Mill, Thorpe le Soken, a windmill in Essex
Great Mill, Wickhambrook, a windmill in Suffolk
Great Mill, Williton, a windmill in Somerset
Great Mill, Woodham Mortimer, a windmill in Essex

De Grote Molen

De Grote Molen, Dokkum, a windmill in Friesland that was demolished in 1840
De Grote Molen, Marrum, a windmill in Friesland
De Grote Molen, Schellinkhout, a windmill in North Holland

Grote Molen

Grote Molen, Stalhille, a windmill in West Flanders, Belgium
Grote Molen, Zoeterwoude-Rijndijk, a windmill in South Holland

Grutte Mûne
Grutte Mûne, Broeksterwâld, a windmill in Friesland

See also 
 Great Mills (disambiguation)